Laurie O’Reilly (died 1998) was a New Zealand rugby union coach, lawyer, lecturer and New Zealand's Commissioner for Children from 1994 to 1997. He was the first coach of the New Zealand women's national team, the Black Ferns.

Early career 
O’Reilly was a family lawyer in Christchurch, and he served as New Zealand's Commissioner for Children from 1994 to 1997. He was also a law lecturer at the University of Canterbury, where he coached the men's team. His daughter Lauren is a former Black Fern.

Coaching career 
In 1988, O’Reilly coached the Crusadettes, the University of Canterbury Women's team, and they toured the United States and Europe. A year later he selected the first women's team to represent New Zealand.

O’Reilly had a hand in organising RugbyFest 1990 in Christchurch. It was a two-week women's rugby festival that featured national teams from the Netherlands, the United States and USSR. 

On 22 July 1989, the first official New Zealand women's team played the California Grizzlies, a touring side from the United States at Lancaster Park in Christchurch. He coached the team to the inaugural 1991 Women's Rugby World Cup in Wales.

The Laurie O'Reilly Cup is named in his honour. New Zealand and Australia have competed for it annually since 1994.

Death 
O’Reilly died from cancer in 1998. He held a living funeral before his death; Wayne Smith, who was mentored by O’Reilly, spoke at the event.

References 

1998 deaths
Children's Ombudspersons in New Zealand
New Zealand rugby union coaches
New Zealand women's national rugby union team coaches